James Tylee (1750–1826 New York City) was an American politician from New York

He was a Federalist member of the New York State Assembly in 1797 and 1812.

1750 births
1826 deaths
Politicians from New York City
Members of the New York State Assembly
New York (state) Federalists